Edwyn Ralph or Edvin Ralph is a village and civil parish  north east of Hereford, in the county of Herefordshire, England. In 2011 the parish had a population of 192. The parish touches Bromyard and Winslow, Collington, Edvin Loach and Saltmarshe, Norton, Thornbury and Wacton. Edwyn Ralph shares a parish council with Collington and Thornbury called "Thornbury Group Parish Council".

Landmarks 
There are 16 listed buildings in Edwyn Ralph. Edwyn Ralph has a church called St Michael and a village hall.

History 
The name "Edvin" means 'Gedda's fen'. Edwyn Ralph was recorded in the Domesday Book as Gedeuen. On 24 March 1884 Upper Horton Farm (which had 1 house in 1891) was transferred from the parish of Wacton to the parish and Butterley Houses (which had 6 houses in 1891) were transferred to Wacton.

References 

Villages in Herefordshire
Civil parishes in Herefordshire